Mount Fox in British Columbia, Canada could refer to:

 Mount Fox (Canadian Rockies)
 Mount Fox (Selkirk Mountains)